Adventures in Two Worlds is the 1952 autobiography of Dr. A. J. Cronin, in which he relates, with much humour, the exciting events of his dual career as a medical doctor and a novelist.

From the flyleaf of 'Beyond This Place' (Angus and Robertson Sydney - London):

Adventures in Two Worlds:  Dr Cronin's published novels make up an imposing list of successes.  This book, his first non-fiction work, which relates moving and dramatic episodes from his dual career as doctor and novelist will certainly be as widely ready and applauded as his preceding publications.

Dr Cronin has recorded not only the achievements of his early life but also the struggles and setbacks that gave him such a sympathetic understanding of the sufferings of others.

External links
Text of Adventures in Two Worlds
Downloadable text

1952 non-fiction books
Books by A. J. Cronin
Literary autobiographies
Books about Scotland
Books about England
Books about the United States
British memoirs
Victor Gollancz Ltd books